Alpha-centractin (yeast) or ARP1 is a protein that in humans is encoded by the ACTR1A gene.

Function 

This gene encodes a 42.6 kD subunit of dynactin, a macromolecular complex consisting of 10-11 subunits ranging in size from 22 to 150 kD. Dynactin binds to both microtubules and cytoplasmic dynein. It is involved in a diverse array of cellular functions, including ER-to-Golgi transport, the centripetal movement of lysosomes and endosomes, spindle formation, chromosome movement, nuclear positioning, and axonogenesis. This subunit is present in 8-13 copies per dynactin molecule, and is the most abundant molecule in the dynactin complex. It is an actin-related protein, and is approximately 60% identical at the amino acid level to conventional actin. ARP1 forms a 37 nm filament-like structure and is the core of the dynactin complex. It only exists in the dynactin complex in vivo. Highly purified, native Arp1 polymerize rapidly at extremely low concentrations into short filaments in vitro that were similar, but not identical, in length to those in dynactin. With time, these Arp1 filaments appeared to anneal to form longer assemblies but never attained the length of conventional actin filaments. As for conventional actin, Arp1 can bind and hydrolyze ATP, and Arp1 assembly is accompanied by nucleotide hydrolysis.

It has been reported that Arp1 interacts with other dynactin components including DCTN1/p150Glued, DCTN4/p62 and Actr10/Arp11. Arp1 has been shown as the domain for dynactin binding to membrane vesicles (such as Golgi or late endosome) through its association with β-spectrin.

Interactions 

ACTR1A has been shown to interact with SPTBN2.

References

Further reading

External links
 
 

Human proteins